This is a list of reptiles of Korea.  It includes reptiles found on the Korean Peninsula as well as the adjoining waters and islands.

Turtles

Lizards

Snakes

Notes

References

External links
Extensive forum thread on Korean snakes

Reptiles
Korea
Reptiles
Korea